Jožin z bažin is a song written by Czech musician and comedian Ivan Mládek and recorded by his group, Banjo Band, in 1977. It is considered the band's best-known song, both at home and internationally. In January 2008, it became popular in Poland, winning several radio hit lists, and the band recorded a Polish version on their album Jozin z bazin w Polsce, released the same year.  It was also popular in Hungary, Austria, and Russia.

Story
The song is a parody on medieval tales, where a brave knight rescues a remote kingdom terrorized by a horrible monster, marries the princess, and receives half the kingdom as a reward. A man driving through the Czech region of Moravia in a Škoda 100 finds a village terrorized by a monster named Jožin (Joey from the swamps), who eats mainly tourists from Prague. The chairman of the local collective farm promises half of the farm, together with his daughter's hand in marriage, if the man defeats the monster. The man asks for a cropduster plane, the only known weapon against the monster. He catches Jožin and then decides to just sell him to a zoo.

Covers and remakes
A Polish cabaret called Kabaret pod Wyrwigroszem created a parody of "Jožin z bažin", entitled "Donald marzy" (Donald dreams), about the Polish prime minister, Donald Tusk. The Russian band Мурзилки International made a Russian parody under the title "Путин едет в Пикалёво" (Putin goes to Pikalyovo), about Russia's president, Vladimir Putin. There is a Serbian version of the song, "Medo Brundo" (Brundo the Bear). There are also several parodies of the song in Lithuanian, which are mainly about the country's most nefarious politicians and about the former prime minister Andrius Kubilius.

American heavy metal band Metallica covered the song during a concert in Prague in 2018, receiving an enthusiastic response from their audience.

References

External links
 
 Sheet music on musescore.com

Czech songs
Czech-language songs
1977 songs
Songs about monsters
Internet memes